Suleiman Masoud Nchambi Suleiman (born 23 April 1979) is a Tanzanian CCM politician and Member of Parliament for Kishapu constituency since 2010.

References

1979 births
Living people
Chama Cha Mapinduzi MPs
Tanzanian MPs 2010–2015
Buluba Secondary School alumni
Shinyanga Commercial School alumni